A skateboard is a type of sports equipment used for skateboarding. It is usually made of a specially designed 7-8 ply maple plywood deck and has polyurethane wheels attached to the underside by a pair of skateboarding trucks.

The skateboarder moves by pushing with one foot while the other foot remains balanced on the board, or by pumping one's legs in structures such as a bowl or half pipe. A skateboard can also be used by standing on the deck while on a downward slope and allowing gravity to propel the board and the rider. If the rider's leading foot is their right foot, they are said to ride "goofy". 

The two main types of skateboards are the longboard and shortboard. The shape of the board is also important: the skateboard must be concaved to perform tricks.

History

Skateboarding started in California in the 1950s. The first skateboards were made from roller skates attached to a board. Skateboarding gained in popularity because of surfing: in fact, skateboarding was initially referred to as "sidewalk surfing". The very first skateboards were handmade from wooden boxes and planks by individuals. Companies started manufacturing skateboards in 1959, as the sport became more popular. In postwar America, society was carefree with children commonly playing in the streets. 

Skateboarding is a very individual activity, and it continues to evolve. Since 2000, due to attention in the media and products like skateboarding video games, children's skateboards and commercialization, skateboarding has been pulled into the mainstream. As more interest and money has been invested into skateboarding, more skate parks, and better skateboards have become available. In addition, the continuing interest has motivated skateboarding companies to keep innovating and inventing new things. Skateboarding appeared for the first time in the 2020 Summer Olympics.

Parts

Deck

The longboard, a common variant of the skateboard, is used for higher speed and rough surface boarding, and they are much more expensive. "Old school" boards (those made in the 1970s–80s or modern boards that mimic their shape) are generally wider and often have only one kicktail. Variants of the 1970s often have little or no concavity.

Wheels 
The wheels allow for movement on the skateboard and helps determine the speed while riding. There are typically four wheels on a skateboard that are attached to the trucks. Ranging in size from around 48mm to around 60mm, smaller wheels are lighter in weight and are used for shorter distances and tricks. Larger wheels are heavier in weight, which are better for maintaining speed and longer distances. Wheels that are larger than 60mm are typically used for longboards.

Trucks

Longboard and skateboard trucks have the same components, but exhibit a different functionality.

Bearings

Each skateboard wheel is mounted on its axle via two ball bearings. These are usually made of steel, though silicon nitride, a high-tech ceramic, is sometimes used. Many skateboard bearings are graded according to the ABEC scale. The starts with ABEC1 as the lowest, followed by 3, 5, 7, and 9. It is a common misconception that the higher ABECs are better for skateboarding, as the ABEC rating only measures tolerances, which do not necessarily apply to skateboards. Bearing performance is determined by how well maintained the bearings are. Maintenance on bearings includes periodically cleaning and lubricating them.

Optional components

Risers/wedges
Wedges can be used to change the turning characteristics of a truck.

Skateboard multi-tool
While not part of a skateboard, an all-in-one skateboard tool capable of mounting and removing trucks & wheels and adjusting truck kingpins are commonly sold by skate shops.

Deck rails
Deck rails are thin, plastic strips usually screwed into the bottom section of a skateboard to decrease friction while performing slide tricks and protecting the board’s graphic from damage.

See also

Caster board
Electric skateboard
Hoverboard
Self-balancing scooter
Slalomboard
Snowboard
Surfboard
Wakeboard

References

American inventions